"No Regrets" is a song recorded by American singer-songwriter Elisabeth Withers. It was released by E1 Records on May 18, 2010 as the second single from Withers' second studio album of the same name (2010). It was written by Withers, Gordon Chambers, Barry Eastmond and produced by the latter pair.

Charts

Release history

References

External links
No Regrets at YouTube

2010 singles
Elisabeth Withers songs
Songs written by Gordon Chambers
Songs written by Barry Eastmond
2010 songs